Mohreh Nar Mohammad (also Romanized as Mohreh Nār Moḩammad; also known as Mohrehnarmohammad) is a village in Chamsangar Rural District, Papi District, Khorramabad County, Lorestan Province, Iran. At the 2006 census, its population was 77, in 16 families.

References 

Towns and villages in Khorramabad County